There was one female and one male athlete representing Mauritania at the 2000 Summer Paralympics.

Events

Athletics

Women–track

Powerlifting

Men

See also
2000 Summer Paralympics

References

Bibliography

External links
International Paralympic Committee

Nations at the 2000 Summer Paralympics
Paralympics
2000